Chiraa is a town in the Bono Region of Ghana. The town is known for the Chiraa High School.  The school is a second cycle institution.

References

Populated places in the Bono Region